Carlos Freile Larrea (1876 – 23 April 1942) was Ecuadorian politician. He was in charge of the executive power of Ecuador from 27 August to 1 September 1932. He was Minister of Finance from 1939 to 1940.

External links
 Carlos Freile Larrea

References 

1876 births
1942 deaths
Ecuadorian people of Galician descent
Presidents of Ecuador
Ecuadorian Ministers of Finance